A list of films produced in the Soviet Union in 1972 (see 1972 in film).

External links
 Soviet films of 1972 at the Internet Movie Database

1972
Soviet
Films